Chicago school may refer to:
 Chicago school (architecture)
 Chicago school (economics)
 Chicago school (literary criticism)
 Chicago school (mathematical analysis)
 Chicago school (sociology)